Homefield is an unincorporated area in the rural municipality of Garry No. 245, in the Canadian province of Saskatchewan. Homefield is located at the junction of Highway 52 & Highway 617 in eastern Saskatchewan.

See also

List of communities in Saskatchewan
List of rural municipalities in Saskatchewan

Ghost towns in Saskatchewan
Garry No. 245, Saskatchewan
Unincorporated communities in Saskatchewan
Division No. 9, Saskatchewan